César Manrique Cabrera ( or ) (24 April 1919 – 25 September 1992) was a Spanish artist, sculptor, architect and nature activist from Lanzarote.

Early life

Manrique was born in Arrecife, Lanzarote, one of the Canary Islands. His father Gumersindo Manrique, originally from Fuerteventura, built the family house in Caleta de Famara. Manrique himself once said this house and its surroundings has impressed him greatly. He fought in the Spanish Civil War as a volunteer in the artillery unit on Franco's side. He attended the University of La Laguna to study architecture, but after two years he quit his studies.

Career 
He moved to Madrid in 1945 and received a scholarship for the Art School of San Fernando, where he graduated as a teacher of art and painting. Between 1964 and 1966 he lived in New York City, where a grant from Nelson Rockefeller allowed him to rent his own studio. He painted many works in New York, which were exhibited in the prestigious "Catherine Viviano" gallery.

Manrique returned to Lanzarote in 1966. Upon his return, he intended to start an artist's colony on the island. Pepín Ramírez, a childhood friend of Manrique as well as the president of the island helped Manrique realize this idea. César Manrique went on to reflect the unique landscape and colour palet of Lanzarote in his art and the architecture on the island. Beside continuing his personal art career, Manrique gained a lot of attention with his commitment to protect Lanzarote from  what he regarded as pernicious tourist developments.  Manrique was not against tourism on the island. On the contrary, he thought (high-quality) tourism should be the economic engine of the island.

His legacy on the island includes the art, culture and tourism centre at Jameos del Agua (1963–87); his Volcano House, Taro de Tahiche (1968); the restaurant at the restored Castillo de San José at Arrecife (1976); the visitors center at the Timanfaya National Park (1971); his Palm Grove House at Haria (1986); the Mirador del Rio (1973), and the Jardin de Cactus at Guatiza.  He had a major influence on the planning regulations on Lanzarote following his recognition of its potential for tourism and lobbied successfully to encourage the sustainable development of the industry. One aspect of this is the ban of high-rise hotels on the island, which do not fit the aesthetic harmony that should cover the entire island, according to Manrique. Those high buildings that were built before the ban are generally keeping with the use of traditional colors in their exterior decoration. Homeowners are encouraged to protect this visual unity by keeping the exterior of the houses white (with specific colors for the woodwork).

Manrique published a book on the topic in 1974 called Architecture Unpublished, collaborating with the renowned Spanish architect Fernando Higueras.

International reputation 

In addition to his artistic engagement in the Canary Islands and on the Spanish peninsula, Manrique also became internationally renowned. In 1990, he created one of the much respected BMW Art Cars with the German designer and paint artist Walter Maurer.

Their collaboration for the international automobile company increased Manrique's fame beyond the country's borders. Manrique maintained a close friendship with Walter Maurer until César Manrique's death in 1992 and was involved in a constant artistic exchange.
 
Before the collaboration with César Manrique, Maurer had already designed BMW Art Cars with other highly recognised international artists such as Andy Warhol, Frank Stella and Roy Lichtenstein. The work for the joint Art Car was carried out in Maurer's studio in Munich. César Manrique took care of the initial design proposals, coordinated them with his artistic partner Walter Maurer and was responsible for the final approval, while Maurer was responsible for applying the design to the BMW 730i.

In september 2019, one hundred years after his birth, Manrique was awarded the Medal of Honor of the University of La Laguna, where he briefly studied architecture at the start of his career.

Death 

Manrique died in a car accident at Tahíche, Teguise, very near the Fundación, his Lanzarote home, in 1992. He was aged 73.

César Manrique Foundation

The César Manrique foundation was set up in 1982 by César Manrique and a group of friends but wasn't officially opened until 1992 after Manrique died. The foundation, based at Manrique's home, following his move to a townhouse in the North of the Island, is a private, non-profit organisation set-up to allow tourists access to Manrique's home. The foundation is also an art-gallery featuring art created by Manrique himself as well as Art that he acquired during his life. The gallery includes original sketches by Pablo Picasso and Joan Miró. The money the foundation takes from ticket sales goes toward raising awareness about the art of Lanzarote, as well as being used to fund the foundation's "artistic, cultural and environmental activities".

Manrique's home itself is built within a 3,000 m2 lot, on the site of the Lanzarote eruptions in the 18th century, and was created upon Manrique's return from New York City in 1966. The rooms on the first floor, including the artist studios, were created with the intention of keeping with Lanzarote traditions, yet making them more modern with open spaces and large windows. The "ground floor", more appropriately titled the "basement", contains five areas situated within volcanic bubbles, the rooms bored into volcanic basalt. There is a central cave which houses a recreational area, including a swimming pool, a barbecue and a small dance floor.

Once outside the main house, the visitor comes to the outside area, where there is a small square with a fountain in the middle before approaching a small café area and the visitor shop. This area was once César Manrique's garage.

One of the foundation's fundamental missions is to oppose the spread of high-rise concrete across the Spanish coastline and her islands. The foundation recently brought attention to 24 illegally erected hotels in Lanzarote.

See also
 List of single-artist museums

Honours

1978 Weltpreis für Ökologie und Tourismus, Berlin, Germany
1986 Europa Nostra Prize European parliament
1989 Art Prize, Canarian government
1989 Fritz Schumacher Prize at the Leibniz University Hannover, Germany

Works

In Lanzarote:
Casa / Museo César Manrique (Manrique's house and artist studio in Haria, with landscaped garden).
Mirador del Rio (built in 1973 overlooking the neighbouring island of Graciosa).
Jameos del Agua (concert venue/nightclub for 600 persons in a cave).
Jardín de Cactus (a cactus garden home to over 1,100 different varieties of cactuses near Guatiza).
Taro de Tahíche (Manrique's house near Teguise, the present seat of the Fundación César Manrique).
International Museum of Contemporary Arts in the Castillo de San José, Arrecife.
Garden and swimming pools of the five-star hotel Las Salinas in Costa Teguise.
El triunfador (built in 1990 in the area of Fundacion César Manrique, a sculpture).
Juguetes del viento (built in 1992 in Arrieta, windmill).
El Diablo, symbol of the Timanfaya National Park.
El Diablo Restaurant (uses volcanic heat to cook).

Outside Lanzarote:
Lago Martiánez (1977, large "semi natural" open air sea-water pool complex in Puerto de la Cruz, Tenerife).
Playa Jardín (volcanic beach and sub-tropical gardens complex in Puerto de la Cruz, Tenerife).
La Vaguada Shopping Centre in Madrid (1983), the first shopping centre perfectly integrated into the natural environment in Spain.
La Peña (1989, a restaurant and belvedere on El Hierro).
Mirador del Palmarejo (1989, a lookout point in La Gomera).
 BMW Art Car in collaboration with Walter Maurer (1990), Munich, Germany.
Canarian Pavilion (1992, Expo 92, Seville, Spain).
Parque Marítimo César Manrique, Santa Cruz de Tenerife, Tenerife

Additional images

References

César, Manrique Arquitectura inédita
ALEJANDRO SCARPA, 2019. César Manrique, acupuntura territorial en Lanzarote. . (Spanish edition with English summarized translations).
Lancelot Internacional, Especial: César Manrique, Lanzarote, 3. Revisada 1996, Lanzarote. Idiomas: Español, Inglés y Alemán (3rd revision 1996, Lanzarote. Languages: English, German and Spanish).

External links

Official website of the Cesar Manrique Foundation
Architectural drawings and location of all Manrique's work in Lanzarote
http://www.cesarmanrique.com
360° Panoramic vtour of the Lago Martiánez and pools

1919 births
1992 deaths
People from Arrecife
Spanish architects
Artists from the Canary Islands
20th-century Spanish painters
20th-century Spanish male artists
Spanish male painters
Spanish sculptors
Spanish male sculptors
Road incident deaths in Spain
20th-century sculptors